Odile Dicks-Mireaux is a British costume designer. Her work include productions for both cinema like the Academy Award-nominated films An Education (2009) and Brooklyn (2015) and television like the BBC One drama The Lost Prince and the HBO miniseries Chernobyl (2019), receiving an Emmy Award for the former and a BAFTA Craft Award for the latter.

Career
Dicks-Mireaux studied threatre design at the Central School of Art and Design in London, United Kingdom. After leaving college she worked in fringe theatre with companies such as Pip Simmons and Belt and Braces.

In 1979, she joined BBC as an assistant, becoming a designer in 1982 working in several television productions from the network including eight episodes from the nineteenth season of the science fiction television series Doctor Who in 1982, the sitcom The Black Adder (1983), the miniseries Oscar (1985) and Melissa (1997) and the two-part series The Woman in White, receiving her first BAFTA nomination for Best Costume Design for the latter in 1998, she was nominated for the award again in 2000 and 2001 for Great Expectations and Gormenghast, respectively, winning for the former.

In 1996, she left BBC and went on to work in different feature films like Stephen Frears's thriller Dirty Pretty Things (2002), Fernando Meirelles's drama thriller The Constant Gardener (2005), Lone Scherfig's coming-of-age drama An Education (2009), for which she was nominated for the BAFTA Award for Best Costume Design and Dustin Hoffman's comedy-drama Quartet (2012).

She has also worked on television series such as BBC One's drama The Lost Prince, for which she won the Primetime Emmy Award for Outstanding Costumes for a Miniseries, Movie, or Special alongside Colin May in 2005, NBC's action drama The Philanthropist and the episode Richard II from BBC Two's The Hollow Crown in 2012 receiving her fourth BAFTA Craft Award nomination.

In 2015, she worked in John Crowley's romantic period drama Brooklyn, receiving several nominations, including for a BAFTA Film Award, a Critics' Choice Award and a Costume Designers Guild Award. In 2019, she worked on the HBO's historical miniseries Chernobyl about the disaster of the same name, for the costumes of the limited series she was nominated for the Primetime Emmy Award for Outstanding Period Costumes alongside Daiva Petrulyte, Holly McLean, Anna Munro and Sylvie Org and won her second BAFTA Television Craft Award.

Dicks-Mireaux also appear in Edgar Wright's upcoming psychological horror film Last Night in Soho and Tom George's upcoming mystery film See How They Run.

Filmography

Film

Television

Awards and nominations

References

External links

British costume designers
Women costume designers
Living people
Year of birth missing (living people)